The American Association of Professional Landmen (AAPL) is a professional organization in the United States that unites approximately 18,000 landmen and land-related persons in North America through professional development and service. AAPL's mission is to promote standards of performance for all land professionals, to advance their stature and to encourage sound stewardship of energy and mineral resources.

Certification 

The association started a voluntary certification program in June 1979. The AAPL provides three levels of certification to attest to a landman's knowledge and expertise. A Registered Landman, the initial certification, identifies someone with a fundamental knowledge of the land industry. The Registered Professional Landman certification identifies someone who has professional experience as a landman. The Certified Professional Landman has demonstrated a comprehensive level of professional experience and competency in the land business.

See also 
 American Association of Petroleum Geologists
 Independent Petroleum Association of America
 Independent Petroleum Association of Mountain States
 Society of Exploration Geophysicists

References

External links 
 AAPL website

Trade associations based in the United States
Petroleum in the United States
Professional associations based in the United States
Non-profit organizations based in Texas
Organizations based in Fort Worth, Texas